Mohsen Rafighdoust (also Rafiqdoust) is an Iranian Revolutionary Guards military officer and conservative politician. He is a member of the Islamic Coalition Party.

Early life
Rafighdoost was born around 1940 in south Tehran. His family background is that of a bazaari, the traditional class of people who work in the bazaar.<ref name="Kaplan, 1996 p.201">Kaplan,  The Ends of the Earth, (1996), p.201</ref> His father was a fruit and vegetable merchant at the Tehran bazaar. His family was very religious and close to Ruhollah Khomeini. In 1953, Rafighdoost was expelled from secondary school due to his pro-Mossadegh activities.

Military career
Mohsen Rafighdoost was the chief of Ruhollah Khomeini's security detail in 1979 during the Iranian Revolution, and helped found the Revolutionary Guards who helped eliminate opposition to theocratic rule in the Islamic Republic.

He is noted for having driven Ruhollah Khomeini, the leader of the Revolution, from the Tehran international airport into Tehran, during Khomeini's triumphant return to Iran from France, while hundreds of Iranians crowded the road to welcome Khomeini back. He has told journalists this was the most important day of his life and "crowds were all over the car, touching and hanging on to it."

He served from 1982 to 1989 as Minister of the Revolutionary Guards where he quashed internal dissent and obtained weapons from abroad for the Iran–Iraq War.

Rafighdoost said in a 2014 interview that he twice suggested to Khomeini that Iran develop weapons of mass destruction to counter their use by Saddam Hussein. Rafighdoost claimed that both times Khomeini rejected the idea, reasoning that it would be against Islam.

Business career
In 1989 he was appointed head of the Mostazafan Foundation or Bonyad-e Mostazafen va Janbazan (Foundation of the Oppressed), "the second-largest commercial enterprise" in Iran behind the state-owned National Iranian Oil Company where he remained until 1999.

Since 1999, Mohsen Rafighdoost has been the Director of the Noor Foundation. The Foundation reportedly owns apartment blocks and "makes an estimated $200 million importing pharmaceuticals, sugar and construction materials."

Controversy
In 1995, Mohsen Rafighdoost's brother, Morteza Rafighdoost, was sentenced to ten years imprisonment for bank fraud. After this, Supreme Leader Ali Khamenei appointed a board of trustees and made the Bonyad-e Mostazafen va Janbazan subject to parliamentary scrutiny.

Rafighdoost's personal fortune is said to be worth the equivalent of many millions of dollars. When asked about his personal wealth, Rafighdoost has responded: "I am just a normal person, with normal wealth, but if Islam is threatened, I will become big again."

References

Bibliography
 A Bazaari's World by Robert D. Kaplan March 1996 Atlantic accessed 15-May-2009, also in (with minor changes) Kaplan, Robert, The Ends of the Earth: A Journey at the Dawn of the 21st Century'', Random House, New York, 1996

1940 births
Living people
People from Tehran
Iranian businesspeople
Government ministers of Iran
Islamic Coalition Party politicians
Islamic Revolutionary Guard Corps brigadier generals
Islamic Revolutionary Guard Corps personnel of the Iran–Iraq War